Chah Morid (also Romanized as Chāh Morīd) is a village in Howmeh Rural District, in the Central District of Kahnuj County, Kerman Province, Iran. At the 2006 census, its population was 1,625, in 353 families.

References 

Populated places in Kahnuj County